The Rural City of Mildura is a local government area in Victoria, Australia, located in the north-western part of the state. It covers an area of  being the largest LGA in the state. In June 2016 the area had a population of 53,878. It includes the city of Mildura and the towns of Merbein, Red Cliffs, Irymple, Ouyen, Werrimull, Murrayville, Walpeup and Hattah. It was formed in 1995 from the amalgamation of the City of Mildura, Shire of Mildura and Shire of Walpeup.

The Rural City is governed and administered by the Mildura Rural City Council; its seat of local government and administrative centre is located at the council headquarters in Mildura, it also has service centres located in Ouyen and a couple of other locations within Mildura. The Rural City is named after the main urban settlement lying in the north of the LGA, that is Mildura, which is also the LGA's most populous urban centre with a population of 30,647.

The Rural City of Mildura covers most of the Mallee region of Victoria. Before the less infertile soils were fertilised and developed for the production of wheat and barley the whole region was covered in a dense mallee scrub of deep-rooting eucalypts that regenerated after the frequent bushfires in the region. Many of the soils are so sandy that clearing is impractical, and Murray-Sunset National Park covers almost a third of the area of the LGA. Other protected areas include Hattah-Kulkyne National Park and Murray-Kulkyne Park on the Murray River.

The southeast of the LGA is used primarily for grain growing; however yield are erratic and often poor due to drought. In the north irrigated fruit growing (primarily oranges and grapes) is highly productive and supports Mildura and nearby towns; however, salinity in the Murray River is a major threat to the long-term sustainability of these activities, as is competition from overseas citrus growers.

In 2006 the Rural City of Mildura had a population of 49,815, most of which was located in Mildura (30,016) and adjacent areas (that is Victorian Sunraysia). Many of the small towns in the region have practically disappeared as more efficient farming methods reduce the quantity of human labour required.

Council

Current composition
The council is composed of nine councillors elected to represent an un-subdivided municipality. Represented in Order of Election. Council Composition as of September 2022:

Administration and governance
The council meets in the council chambers at the council headquarters in the Mildura Municipal Offices, which is also the location of the council's administrative activities. It also provides customer services at both its administrative centre on Madden Avenue in Mildura, and its service centres in Ouyen and on Deakin Avenue in Mildura.

Townships and localities
The 2021 census, the rural city had a population of 56,972 up from 53,878 in the 2016 census

^ - Territory divided with another LGA

Sister cities

Mildura has sister city relations with the following cities:

 Dali, Yunnan Province of China
 Kumatori, Japan
 Upland, California, United States of America

See also
 List of places on the Victorian Heritage Register in the Rural City of Mildura

Notes

References

External links

Mildura Rural City Council
Metlink local public transport map
Link to Land Victoria interactive maps

Local government areas of Victoria (Australia)
Loddon Mallee (region)